The 2020–21 Football Superleague of Kosovo season was the 22nd season of top-tier football in Kosovo. The season began on 18 September 2020 and ended on 23 May 2021. A total of 10 teams competed in the league: eight teams from the 2019–20 season and two teams from the 2019–20 First Football League of Kosovo. Drita were the defending champions from the previous season.

Teams
Ten teams competed in the league – the top eight teams from the previous season and the two teams promoted from the First Football League of Kosovo. The promoted teams are Besa Pejë and Arbëria. They replaced Flamurtari, Vushtrria, Dukagjini and Ferizaj.

Stadiums and locations

Note: Table lists in alphabetical order.

Personnel and kits

League table

Results

First half of season

Second half of season

Relegation play-offs

Season statistics

First goal of the season:  Kreshnik Bahtiri for Arbëria against Trepça '89 (18 September 2020).
Last goal of the season:  Blendi Baftiu for Ballkani against Prishtina (23 May 2021).

Top scorers

Top assisters

Hat-tricks
Player in italic is not part of the Superleague.

Notes and references

Notes

References

External links
 

Football Superleague of Kosovo seasons
Kosovo
Superleague